d'Estaville, also spelled D'Estaville, is a large bluestone Italianate-style heritage-listed house located at 7 Barry Street in the Melbourne suburb of Kew, Victoria, Australia. Designed by architects Knight & Kerr for politician and long term Chief Justice of Victoria, Sir William Foster Stawell, d’Estaville was completed in 1859. d’Estaville is a fine and unusual example of the Italianate style, and the only residential work of Knight & Kerr, designers of the Victorian Parliament House.

In 1888, with failing health, Stawell subdivided and sold land from the  property then known as the d'Estaville Estate along Princess Street, and a land company subdivided the remainder of the estate, which failed to sell, so the house and the steeply sloping land to the river stayed with the family until subdivided and sold in 1904.

Key influences and design approach

d'Estaville is one of the few Melbourne mansions built out of bluestone. The house is a two storey Anglo-Italian villa featuring its slightly asymmetrical massing of thick bluestone with classical details. The Italian Villa/Italianate style was also part of the romantic and picturesque movement. The style expressed a desire for greater freedom of architectural expression and for more organic and complicated forms. The aesthetic value derives from the highly refined stone work of the entry portico and rock faced quoins that surround the windows and corner walls.

The corners and windows of the house are constructed of bluestone blocks that have axed corners and their centres have a rock face. The other parts of the bluestone walls are coursed squared rubble. The house has a series of low pitched roofs, formed out of a series of truss-like members and clad with slate. Cornice with decorative trapezoidal brackets shows its classical heritage. Holes are cut into the eaves in the shape of diamonds and eight pointed stars for decoration. Double hung windows with curved segmental arches over them are used on the ground and upper floors of the original design. The only exceptions are the large Serlian window to the western elevation and the tripartite window above it. The service area of the building has narrower windows. These windows are divided into six by glazing bars. d’Estaville lacks the cupola, a square tower with bracketed cornices, which is generally a common feature of Italianate style architecture.

Through its years, the building has seen different renovations and extensions from many owners that have been added to the structure.

Significance
d’Estaville is a mansion of historical significance for its connection with Sir William Foster Stawell and the architects Knight & Kerr, and architectural significance for its exceptionally fine bluestone work. The house is the only known existing residential building designed by Knight & Kerr. This demonstrates the Stawell's position and importance in Colonial society along with exhibiting good design and aesthetic characteristics of the Classical Revival style.  The building was listed on the Victorian Heritage Register in 1974.

See also

List of heritage listed buildings in Melbourne

References

External links
Subdivision of d'Estaville

Houses in Melbourne
Italianate architecture in Melbourne
Heritage-listed buildings in Melbourne
Buildings and structures in the City of Boroondara
Houses completed in 1859
1859 establishments in Australia